The Papoose Hills,  el. , is a set of hills northwest of Glasgow, Montana in Valley County, Montana.

See also
 List of mountain ranges in Montana

Notes

Mountain ranges of Montana
Landforms of Valley County, Montana